Saba Khvadagiani (born 30 January 2003) is a Georgian professional footballer who plays as a defender for Erovnuli Liga club Dinamo Tbilisi.

International career
He made his Georgia national football team debut on 8 September 2021 in a friendly against Bulgaria, a 1–4 away loss.

References

External links
 

2003 births
Living people
Footballers from Georgia (country)
Georgia (country) youth international footballers
Georgia (country) under-21 international footballers
Georgia (country) international footballers
Association football defenders
FC Dinamo Tbilisi players
Erovnuli Liga players